Crystal Hoang (born March 8, 1988) is an American actress and producer.  She has appeared in several films including The Untitled Kris Black Project and The Social Network.  She plays Gina in ABC's The Deep End.  She also appears on Comedy Central's Tosh.0.

Childhood
Hoang was born in Dallas, Texas.  She has lived in Paris, France and other areas of Europe.  During Hoang's childhood, she won several state sponsored academic competitions.  She was a published author by age twelve, with two poems in Anthologies for Young Americas.  Later she went on to publish several articles for newspapers.

In high school, Hoang was president of The National Honor Society, Lieutenant Governor of Key Club, and a member of SADD.  She volunteered over 1000 hours of her time by the time she graduated high school.  She was a Varsity Cheerleader and was an avid Gymnast.  She also competed in Academic Decathlon.

Career
Hoang began acting in college.  She starred in the musical Sizzle her freshman year.  She has also performed the Nation Anthem live at several events.

She worked on a Television Show in Spain called IB3.  She also works as a model on the Island of Ibiza and appears on several Billboards.  In 2009, she appeared alongside Jesse Eisenberg in The Social Network, Directed by David Fincher.

Hoang speaks four languages including English, Vietnamese, French, and Spanish and is currently learning Mandarin.

References

External links

Model Mayhem Website

1988 births
People from Dallas
Living people
21st-century American actresses
American expatriates in France